Dan King may refer to:

 Dan King (skeptic) (1791–1864), American physician and early skeptical writer
 Dan King (basketball) (1931–2003), American basketball player
 Dan King, Canadian Green Party candidate

See also
 Daniel King (disambiguation)